Rubus fraxinifolius, also known as mountain raspberry in English or ragimot, is a species of flowering plant, a fruiting shrub in the raspberry family, that is native to Asia.

Description
The species grows as an erect shrub to 2–3 m in height, with thorns on the stems. The oval, pinnate leaves are 2–9 cm long by 1.4 cm wide, with serrated edges. The inflorescences consist of panicles of white flowers. The edible, orange to red, ovoid fruits, up to 2.5 cm long by 1.5 cm in diameter, are aggregates of drupelets.

Distribution and habitat
The species is found in much of Southeast Asia and Melanesia, from Taiwan through the Philippines, Borneo, Java and Sulawesi to New Guinea and the Solomon Islands. It occurs in open and disturbed areas, such as on landslides, riverbanks and roadsides, from the lowlands up to an elevation of 3,000 m in montane forest.

References

fraxinifolius
Flora of Malesia
Flora of Papuasia
Fruits originating in Asia
Plants described in 1804
Taxa named by Jean Louis Marie Poiret